Veronis Suhler Stevenson, known by its initials, VSS, is a private investment firm that invests in the information, business services, healthcare IT, education, media and marketing industries in North America and Europe.

Since 1987, VSS has managed seven private investment funds with aggregate initial capital commitments totaling over $3 billion, including four equity funds and two structured capital funds. To date, VSS funds have invested in 74 platform companies, which have together completed over 330 add-on acquisitions.

VSS has headquarters in New York City, and has offices in London, where it operates as Veronis Suhler Stevenson International Ltd.

Corporate history
The company was founded as Veronis, Suhler & Associates (VS&A) in 1981, by John J. Veronis and John S. Suhler. Veronis cofounded Psychology Today magazine and its associated enterprises, and Suhler was a former president of CBS Publishing Group. Jeffrey T. Stevenson joined the company the following year, and became a named partner in 2001.

Investment and buyout activities
 VSS's portfolio of equity and capital funds have been invested in 74 companies, resulting in over 300 add-ons and acquisitions transactions. Current and former platform company investments for VSS include Infobase Publishing, Kansas Broadcasting System, ITE Group, Granada Learning, CSC Media Group, Cambium Learning Group, and Yellow Book USA.

In 2005, VSS partnered with Mecom Group—an investment company headed by former Mirror Group chief executive David Montgomery—to acquire Berliner Verlag, the publisher of German daily newspapers Berliner Zeitung and Berliner Kurier, among other titles; the acquisition of the company was valued at £53m from the former owners Holtzbrinck, representing the first foreign takeover of a German daily newspaper.

Media industry publications
In addition to its investment and recapitalization portfolios, VSS also conducts and publishes research data on financing & statistics, forecasts and industry trends for the media, publishing and communications sector. It produces two widely consulted American media industry periodicals, Communications Industry Forecast and Communications Industry Report.

References

Further reading

External links
 
 
 

Private equity firms of the United States
Companies based in New York City
Financial services companies established in 1981
Investment companies based in New York City